Quality Time is the fourteenth studio album by power electronics band Whitehouse, released in 1995 through their Susan Lawly label. The cover art was illustrated by Trevor Brown, who made artwork for the band's previous album, Halogen, and their 1991 album, Twice Is Not Enough. The album was reissued on vinyl format in 2009 through Very Friendly.

The track "Baby" is composed solely of samples of baby noises. When Quality Time was uploaded to the music sharing website MP3.com, the track stirred controversy within the website's community, with users calling the band "extremely pretentious" and the track "one of the worst forms of electronic creations [they'd] ever heard".

Track listing

Personnel
Whitehouse - music, production
Steve Albini - recording, production
Denis Blackham - mastering
Trevor Brown - artwork
Akiko Hada - photography
Mike Reber - photography
Atholl Drummond - graphic design

References

External links
 

1995 albums
Whitehouse (band) albums
Albums produced by Steve Albini